Albert Martin Bendle (30 October 1893 – 11 September 1967) was an Australian rules footballer who played for the Geelong Football Club in the Victorian Football League (VFL).

Notes

External links 

1893 births
1967 deaths
Australian rules footballers from Victoria (Australia)
Geelong Football Club players
East Geelong Football Club players
Australian military personnel of World War I